Lefors Independent School District is a public school district based in Lefors, Texas (USA).

The district has one school that serves students in grades pre-kindergarten through twelve.

Academic achievement
In 2009, the school district was rated "academically acceptable" by the Texas Education Agency.

Special programs

Athletics
Lefors High School plays six-man football.

Notable alumni
Warren Chisum, former member of the Texas House of Representatives from Pampa, graduated from Lefors High School in 1957.

See also

List of school districts in Texas

References

External links
Lefors ISD

School districts in Gray County, Texas